Khunik (also Romanized as Khūnīk) is a village in Alqurat Rural District, in the Central District of Birjand County, South Khorasan Province, Iran. At the 2006 census, its population was 17, in 6 families.

References 

Populated places in Birjand County